Qualifier 3 of the Qualifying Round of the 2013 World Baseball Classic was held at Rod Carew Stadium, Panama City, Panama from November 15 to 19, 2012.

Qualifier 3 was a modified double-elimination tournament. The winners for the first games matched up in the second game, while the losers faced each other in an elimination game. The winners of the elimination game then played the losers of the non-elimination game in another elimination game. The remaining two teams then played each other to determine the winners of the Qualifier 3.

Bracket

Results
All times are Eastern Standard Time (UTC−05:00).

Brazil 3, Panama 2

Colombia 8, Nicaragua 1

Brazil 7, Colombia 1

Panama 6, Nicaragua 2

Panama 9, Colombia 7

Brazil 1, Panama 0

External links
Official website

Qualifier 3
World Baseball Classic – Qualifier 3
21st century in Panama City
International baseball competitions hosted by Panama
World Baseball Classic – Qualifier 3
Sports competitions in Panama City